La mujer prohibida may refer to:
 La mujer prohibida (1972 TV series)
 La mujer prohibida (1991 TV series)